Howard Russell MacEwan (8 May 1925 – 29 June 2008) was a Progressive Conservative party member of the House of Commons of Canada. He was born in Westville, Nova Scotia and became a barrister and solicitor by career.

He was first elected at the Pictou riding in the 1957 general election, then re-elected there in the 1958, 1962, 1963 and 1965. With riding boundary changes, MacEwan won re-election at Central Nova riding in the 1968 federal election. He left federal politics in January 1971, during his term in the 28th Canadian Parliament, to become a Nova Scotia provincial judge at Amherst. From 1977 to 1991, he was based in New Glasgow.

Russell MacEwan died at Aberdeen Hospital in New Glasgow, Nova Scotia on 29 June 2008.

Electoral history

References

External links
 

1925 births
2008 deaths
Judges in Nova Scotia
Lawyers in Nova Scotia
Members of the House of Commons of Canada from Nova Scotia
People from Pictou County
Progressive Conservative Party of Canada MPs